V. Nagendra Prasad is a lyricist, composer and director who predominantly works for Kannada Cinema. He has penned more than 3000  songs, particularly for Kannada cinema.

Early life 

He was born on 3 December 1975. He is the elder son to Couple M.V. Venkata Ramanappa and Chandramma of Ijjala Ghatta village in Nagamangala Taluk, Mandya District.

He did his schooling in Doddaballapura, Bangalore and completed his Post-Graduation in Kannada Literature at Manasa Gangothri, Mysore University..  Prasad obtained his D.Litt (Doctor of Literature) from Hampi University In the year 2021.

Career
V. Nagendra Prasad made his debut as a Kannada lyricist for the movie Gajina Mane directed by K. V. Jayaram in 2000. He was appreciated for his another debut as a dialogue writer for supernatural film written and directed by K. Raghavendra Rao, Sri Manjunatha. His debut as a director for Nalla featuring Sudeep was remarkable. He has also worked in music composition, direction, acting and dialogue writing for Television. He is also known to be involved in Theatre both on Stage and in Street plays. In 2018, he made his debut as a lead actor in his own directorial Googal movie. His another appearance as a lead actor in the movie Guruji.

As lyricist
V. Nagendra Prasad has penned more than 3000 songs for over a 1000 movies, 100s Devotional, Classical, Patriotic, Promotional albums and over 50 TV serials.
He has worked with most of the music composers including Ilayaraja, Hamsalekha, Rajan–Nagendra, Upendra Kumar, Sadhu Kokila, Gurukiran, V. Harikrishna, Arjun Janya, Vidhya Sagar, V.Manohar, Rajesh Ramanath, Raghu Dixit, Anoop Seelin, Mano Murthy, Deva, M. M. Keeravani, Gandharva, L. N. Shastri, Jessie Gift, Chandan Shetty, Ravi Basrur, Sridhar V. Sambhram, Bharath B. J., B. Ajaneesh Loknath, Manikanth Kadri, Poornachandra Tejaswi, Manisharma, Thaman, R. P. Patnaik, Sandeep Chowta, Venkat Narayan, Gowtham Srivatsav, Vineeth Menon, D Imman, Yuvan Shankar Raja, Charan Raj and others.

Notable songs

Music director

Dialogue writer
Sri Manjunatha (2001)
'Romeo Juliet'  (2002)
Swathi Muthu (2003)
Dharma (2004)
Shivalinga (2016)
Rogue (2017)
Muniratna Kurukshetra (2018)

Director

Awards
Partial list of awards.

References

External links
 

Kannada film directors
Living people
Kannada film score composers
Kannada-language lyricists
Indian male songwriters
Indian male film actors
People from Mandya district
Filmfare Awards South winners
1975 births
21st-century Indian composers
Musicians from Bangalore
Film directors from Bangalore
Male actors from Bangalore
Male actors in Kannada cinema
21st-century Indian film directors
Indian male film score composers
21st-century male musicians